Bhojpur District may refer to:
 Bhojpur district, India
 Bhojpur District, Nepal

District name disambiguation pages